C. K. Gohain (b. Chowkham, Lohit district , NEFA in 1931, died 16 Feb 2014) was Indian politician from Arunachal Pradesh state of India. He was nominated Member of the Lok Sabha from then North-East Frontier Agency by the President of India in 1971. Earlier he was nominated member of 4th Lok Sabha from NEFA in 1970, after the death of Daying Ering.

He was Agriculturist and social worker by profession. He was Chief Commissioner for Boy Scouts and Girls Guides of NEFA Branch. He was member of Social Welfare Advisory Board of NEFA.

He died on 17 Feb 2014 and survived by his wife Naug Sumecha,  4 sons and daughter.

References

Arunachal Pradesh politicians
People from Lohit district
1931 births
2014 deaths
India MPs 1971–1977
India MPs 1967–1970
Lok Sabha members from Arunachal Pradesh